Michael Edward McGlynn (12 February 1922 – 24 September 2007) was an Australian rules footballer who played with Geelong in the Victorian Football League (VFL).

Prior to playing with Geelong, McGlynn served in both the Australian Army and the Royal Australian Air Force during World War II.

Notes

External links 

1922 births
2007 deaths
Australian rules footballers from Victoria (Australia)
Geelong Football Club players